Le Vivier-sur-Mer (literally Le Vivier on Sea; ; Gallo: Le Vivier) is a commune in the Ille-et-Vilaine department of Brittany in north-western France.

Population
Inhabitants of Le Vivier-sur-Mer are called in French vivarais.

See also
Communes of the Ille-et-Vilaine department

References

External links

Mayors of Ille-et-Vilaine Association 

Communes of Ille-et-Vilaine